Solemont is a commune in the Doubs department in the Bourgogne-Franche-Comté region in eastern France.

Geography
It is near the valley of the Barbèche.

Population

See also
 Communes of the Doubs department

References

External links

 Solemont on the regional Web site 

Communes of Doubs